Civard Sprockel (born 10 May 1983) is a Dutch footballer who plays for RKHVV.

Career
He formerly played for Feyenoord, Excelsior, Vitesse Arnhem, Cyprus Anorthosis Famagusta and Bulgarian CSKA Sofia and was a member of the Dutch team at the 2001 FIFA World Youth Championship.

Sprockel made his debut for Notts County on 8 August 2015 in the first match of the 2015–16 season, a 2–0 victory at Stevenage, but was substituted at half-time due to injury.

He has since played on amateur level in the Netherlands for VV DUNO and RKHVV.

References

External links

1983 births
Living people
Dutch footballers
Netherlands youth international footballers
Curaçao footballers
Dutch people of Curaçao descent
Eredivisie players
Eerste Divisie players
First Professional Football League (Bulgaria) players
Cypriot First Division players
Feyenoord players
Excelsior Rotterdam players
SBV Vitesse players
Anorthosis Famagusta F.C. players
PFC CSKA Sofia players
Botev Plovdiv players
Othellos Athienou F.C. players
Notts County F.C. players
FC Eindhoven players
UEFA Cup winning players
People from Willemstad
Expatriate footballers in Cyprus
Expatriate footballers in Bulgaria
Expatriate footballers in England
Association football defenders
English Football League players
VV DUNO players
Vierde Divisie players